In mathematics, the Calderón–Zygmund lemma is a fundamental result in Fourier analysis, harmonic analysis, and singular integrals. It is named for the mathematicians Alberto Calderón and Antoni Zygmund.

Given an integrable function , where  denotes Euclidean space and  denotes the complex numbers, the lemma gives a precise way of partitioning  into two sets: one where  is essentially small; the other a countable collection of cubes where  is essentially large, but where some control of the function is retained.

Covering lemma
Let  be integrable and  be a positive constant. Then there exists an open set  such that:

(1)  is a disjoint union of open cubes, such that for each ,

Calderón–Zygmund decomposition
Given  as above, we may write  as the sum of a "good" function  and a "bad" function , . To do this, we define

and let . Consequently we have that

 
for each cube .

The function  is thus supported on a collection of cubes where  is allowed to be "large", but has the beneficial property that its average value is zero on each of these cubes.

See also
Singular integral operators of convolution type, for a proof and application of the lemma in one dimension.
Rising sun lemma

References 
 
  
 

Theorems in Fourier analysis
Lemmas in analysis